Koichi Hori (堀 幸一, born April 2, 1969) is a former Nippon Professional Baseball infielder.

External links

1969 births
Living people
Baseball people from Nagasaki Prefecture
Japanese baseball players
Nippon Professional Baseball infielders
Lotte Orions players
Chiba Lotte Marines players
Japanese baseball coaches
Nippon Professional Baseball coaches
People from Nagasaki